Garza East Unit was a correctional transfer unit on the grounds of Chase Field Industrial Complex in unincorporated Bee County, Texas, near Beeville. It was co-located with the Garza West Unit. The facility closed in 2020.

The facility was operated by the Correctional Institutions Division of the Texas Department of Criminal Justice, administered as within Region IV.

The facility was classified as a Transfer Facility that housed adult male inmates convicted of felonies and state jail felonies.  The inmates were housed temporarily after their transfer from county jails and were held no longer than two years, as per Texas Department of Criminal Justice policy.

History
The Chase Field East Unit opened in 1994. It was later renamed Garza East Unit. The facility was named after Raul "Rudy" Garza, Sr., a city council member of Beeville and a longtime employee of the Chase Field Industrial Complex.

See also
 McConnell Unit - State prison near Beeville

References

External links

 Garza East Transfer Facility

Prisons in Texas
Buildings and structures in Bee County, Texas
1994 establishments in Texas